

Qualification 

The top four teams in the Atlantic Coast Conference earned a berth into the ACC Tournament. All rounds are held at WakeMed Soccer Park in Cary, NC.

Bracket

Schedule

Semi-finals

Finals

All-Tournament team
 Joanna Boyles, North Carolina
 Cameron Castleberry, North Carolina
 Megan Connolly, Florida State
 Kristen Crowley, Florida State
 Makenzy Doniak, Virginia
 Natalia Kuikka, Florida State (MVP)
 Kristen McNabb, Virginia
 Alexa Newfield, North Carolina
 Alexis Shaffer, Virginia
 Emily Sonnett, Virginia
 Cheyna Williams, Florida State

See also 
 Atlantic Coast Conference
 2015 Atlantic Coast Conference women's soccer season
 2015 NCAA Division I women's soccer season
 2015 NCAA Division I women's soccer tournament

References 

ACC Women's Soccer Tournament
2015 Atlantic Coast Conference women's soccer season